Louis M. Glackens (1866–1933) was an American illustrator, animator, and cartoonist, commonly credited as L. M. Glackens. He was the brother of Ashcan School painter and illustrator William Glackens.

Life
Glackens was born in Philadelphia, Pennsylvania.  In the 1890s he began to work for Puck, a magazine known for its political and social satire, where his humorous depictions of different ethnic groups reflected the melting pot of New York City at that time.  When Puck was sold in 1914, he began to work for Barré Studio and Bray Productions pioneering some early animation films.

Glackens also worked as a book illustrator, creating humorous illustrations for The Log of the Water Wagon and Monsieur and Madame. He was hired by Samuel Sorenson Adams to create advertisements for the Joy Buzzer and other classic novelty items.

External links

  (all graphic, or nearly so)

1866 births
1933 deaths
American illustrators
American animators
Bray Productions people